The Spanish Love Deception is Elena Armas's debut novel, independently published February 22, 2021. After becoming popular on TikTok, the book was picked up by Simon & Schuster, with an audiobook being released November 2021. A paperback version of the book was published by Atria Books February 1, 2022.

Reception 
The Spanish Love Deception received a positive review from Publishers Weekly.

References 

Simon & Schuster books
Novels set in Spain